2159 Kukkamäki, provisional designation , is a stony asteroid from the inner region of the asteroid belt, approximately 11 kilometers in diameter. It was discovered on 16 October 1941, by Finnish astronomer Liisi Oterma at Turku Observatory in Southwest Finland. It was later named after Finnish geodesist Tauno Kukkamäki.

Orbit and classification 

Kukkamäki is a stony S-type asteroid. It orbits the Sun in the inner main-belt at a distance of 2.4–2.6 AU once every 3 years and 11 months (1,429 days). Its orbit has an eccentricity of 0.04 and an inclination of 3° with respect to the ecliptic.

Diameter and albedo 

According to the survey carried out by NASA's Wide-field Infrared Survey Explorer with its subsequent NEOWISE mission, Kukkamäki measures between 9.86 and 12.14 kilometers in diameter, and its surface has an albedo between 0.193 and 0.337, while the Collaborative Asteroid Lightcurve Link assumes a standard albedo for stony asteroids of 0.20 and derives a diameter of 11.30 kilometers based on an absolute magnitude of 12.1.

Lightcurve 

During an asteroid survey conducted at McDonald Observatory and CTIO in the 1980s, a rotational lightcurve of Kukkamäki was obtained by astronomer Richard Binzel. The photoelectric observation gave a well-defined rotation period of 4.06 hours with a brightness variation of 0.32 magnitude, superseding a previous result based on a fragmentary lightcurve.

Naming 

This minor planet was named after Finnish geodesist Tauno Kukkamäki (1909–1997), who was the director of the Finnish Geodetic Institute for many years and the president of the International Association of Geodesy. He was also a distinguished disciple of Yrjö Väisälä. The official naming citation was published by the Minor Planet Center on 1 November 1979.

References

External links 
 Asteroid Lightcurve Database (LCDB), query form (info )
 Dictionary of Minor Planet Names, Google books
 Asteroids and comets rotation curves, CdR – Observatoire de Genève, Raoul Behrend
 Discovery Circumstances: Numbered Minor Planets (1)-(5000) – Minor Planet Center
 
 

002159
Discoveries by Liisi Oterma
Named minor planets
19411016